Sri Venugopalaswamy Temple is a Hindu-Vaishnavite temple situated at Karvetinagaram in, Chittoor District of Andhra Pradesh state, India. The Temple is dedicated to Lord Krishna, ninth incarnation of Vishnu's Dasavatharam, who is referred to as Venugopala. It is situated at a distance of 58 km from Tirupati and 12 km from Puttur.

History
The temple was built by King Venkataperumal of Venkataraja dynasty.

Administration
The temple is being administered by Tirumala Tirupati Devasthanams.

Presiding deities
The Garbhagriha hosts Venugopala swamy along with his consorts Rukmini and Satyabhama. The deities were brought from Narayanavanam Temple. There are subshrines dedicated to Rama along with Sita and Lakshmana, Anjaneya, Parthasarathy, Renuka parameshwari, Avanakshamma. The temple pond is referred to as skanda pushkarini.

Poojas and Festivals
Daily rituals are held as per Vaikanasa Agama. Temple celebrates Krishna Janmastami, Utlotsavam, Brahmotsavams, Vaikuntha Ekadasi, Ugadi, Sankranti

Songs and Hymns
Sarangapani, an early 18th century Telugu poet, had written many songs in praise of Venugopala swamy of this Temple, in Padam tradition. About 200 of his songs are in survive today in print form.

See also
List of temples under Tirumala Tirupati Devasthanams
Kalyana Venkateswara Temple, Narayanavanam
Vedanarayana Temple, Nagalapuram

References 

Hindu temples in Chittoor district